Popcorn is a 1998 play by English author Ben Elton adapted from his novel of the same title.

References

Further reading
 

1998 plays
Comedy plays
Plays based on novels
West End plays
Plays set in Los Angeles